Shush Metro Station is a station in Tehran Metro Line 1. It is located in Shush Street. It is between Payane Jonoob Metro Station and Meydan-e Mohammadiyeh Metro Station.

Route 5 of the Tehran trolleybus system served Meydan-e-Shush (Shush Square) starting in the 1990s, and thus connected with the metro system at this station after the station's opening in 2001. However, all trolleybus service in Tehran was discontinued around 2013.

Facilities 
The station has a ticket office, escalators, elevators, cash machines, toilets, a taxi stand, public transportation, a pay phone, water fountains, and a lost and found.

References 

Tehran Metro stations
Railway stations opened in 2001